Fana is a town and seat of the commune of Guegneka in Mali's Koulikoro Region. Fana has a population of approximately 25,631 inhabitants.

Boasting a major production site of the Compagnie malienne pour le développement du textile (CMDT), Fana is Mali's second greatest site of cotton production after Koutiala.

Fana accommodated the 4th edition of the Forum des peuples in 2005.

International relations

Twin towns – Sister cities
Fana is twinned with:
  Amboise, France

See also

 Fana for the Norwegian borough of the same name.

Populated places in Koulikoro Region